Acolutha is a genus of moths in the family Geometridae described by Warren in 1894.

Species
 Acolutha albipunctata (Holloway, 1976)
 Acolutha bicristipennis
 Acolutha canicosta
 Acolutha flavifascia
 Acolutha flavipictaria
 Acolutha flavivitta
 Acolutha imbecilla
 Acolutha interposita
 Acolutha pictaria (Moore, 1888)
 Acolutha poiensis
 Acolutha pulchella
 Acolutha semifulva
 Acolutha shirozui
 Acolutha subflava
 Acolutha subrotunda
 Acolutha talis

References

Larentiinae
Geometridae genera